The Pushyabhuti dynasty (IAST: Puṣyabhūti), also known as the Vardhana dynasty ruled in northern India during 6th and 7th centuries. The dynasty reached its zenith under its last ruler Harsha Vardhana (c. 590–647 CE), and the Empire of Harsha covered much of north and north-western India, extending till Kamarupa in the east and Narmada River in the south. The dynasty initially ruled from Sthanveshvara (in modern Kurukshetra district, Haryana), but Harsha eventually made Kanyakubja (modern Kannauj, Uttar Pradesh) his capital, from where he ruled until 647 CE.

Etymology and name 
According to Harsha-charita, composed by the court poet Bana, the family was known as Pushyabhuti dynasty (IAST: Puṣyabhūti-vaṃśa), or Pushpabhuti dynasty (IAST: Puṣpabhūti-vaṃśa). The manuscripts of Harsha-charita use the variant "Pushpabhuti", but Georg Bühler proposed that this was a scribal error, and that the correct name was Pushyabhuti. Several modern scholars now use the form "Pushpabhuti", while others prefer the variant "Pushyabhuti". 

Some modern books describe the dynasty as "Vardhana", because the names of its kings end with the suffix "-vardhana". However, this may be misleading as the names of kings of other dynasties also end with this suffix.

Origins 
No concrete information is available about the origins of the dynasty. Harshacharita by the 7th century poet Bana gives a legendary account of their origin, naming Pushyabhuti as the dynasty's founder. According to this legend, Pushyabhuti lived in the Srikantha janapada (modern Kurukshetra district), whose capital was Sthanvishvara (modern Thanesar). A devotee of Shiva, Pushyabhuti became involved in a tantric ritual at a cremation ground, under the influence of Bhairavacharya, a teacher from "the South". At the end of this ritual, a goddess (identified with Lakshmi) anointed him the king and blessed him as the founder of a great dynasty. The Pushyabhuti mentioned in Bana's account appears to be a fictional character, as he is not mentioned in the dynasty's inscriptions or any other source.

During Prabhakarvardhan's rule this dynasty became prominent. His son Harshvardhan further expand Vardhan kingdom in his rule.

The writings of Xuanzang and an 8th century Buddhist text, the Arya-manjushri-mula-kalpa suggest that the dynasty belonged to the Vaishya caste.

History 

The Pushyabhuti dynasty originally ruled a small area around their capital Sthaneshvara (Thanesar). According to Hans T. Bakker, their ruler Aditya-Vardhana (or Aditya-Sena) was probably a feudatory to Sharva-varman, the Maukhari king of Kannauj. His successor Prabhakara-Vardhana may have also been a feudatory to the Maukhari king Avanti-Varman in his early days. Prabhakara's daughter Rajyashri married Avanti-Varman's son Graha-Varman. As a result of this marriage, Prabhakara's political status increased significantly, and he assumed the imperial title Parama-bhattaraka Maharajadhiraja. ("the one to whom the other kings bow because of his valour and affection").

According to the Harshacharita, after Prabhakara's death, the king of Malava attacked Kannauj, supported by the ruler of Gauda. The Malava king killed Graha-Varman, and captured Rajyashri. Bana does not mention this king, but historians speculate him to be a ruler of the Later Gupta dynasty. Prabhakara's elder son Rajya-Vardhana defeated the Malava ruler, but was killed by the Gauda king.

The Harshacharita further states that Prabhakara's younger son Harsha-Vardhana then vowed to destroy the Gauda king and their allies.  Again, Bana does not mention the name of the Gauda king, but historians identify him with Shashanka-Deva, the ruler of Bengal (Gauda). Harsha formed an alliance with Bhaskar Varman, the king of Kamarupa, and forced Shashanka to retreat. Subsequently, in 606 CE, Harsha was formally crowned as an emperor. He captured a large part of northern India (see the Empire of Harsha). There are different assessments of the exact extent of Harsha's empire, but he controlled major parts of northern India; his overlordship was accepted by the king of Vallabhi in the west and the Kamarupa king Bhaskaravarman in the east; in the south, his empire extended up to the Narmada River.

Harsha eventually made Kanyakubja (modern Kannauj in Uttar Pradesh) his capital, and ruled till c. 647 CE. He died without an heir, leading to the end of the Pushyabhuti dynasty.

Rulers 

The following are the known rulers of the Pushyabhuti or Vardhana dynasty, with estimated period of reign (IAST names in bracket):

List of Rulers–

See also
 Middle kingdoms of India
 List of Hindu empires and dynasties

References

Bibliography 

 
 
 
 
 
 
 

 
States and territories established in the 6th century
States and territories disestablished in the 7th century
6th-century establishments in Nepal